Belukha Mountain (Altay: Ӱч-Сӱмер, Üç-Sümer, lit. 'icemount peak'), located in the Katun Mountains, is the highest peak of the Altai Mountains in Russia and the highest of the system of the South Siberian Mountains. It is part of the Golden Mountains of Altai World Heritage Site.

Since 2008, one is required to apply for a special border zone permit in order to be allowed into the area (if travelling independently without using an agency). Foreigners should apply for the permit to their regional FSB border guard office two months before the planned date.

Geography
Located in the Altai Republic, Belukha is a three-peaked mountain massif that rises along the border of Russia and Kazakhstan, just a few dozen miles north of the point where this border meets with the border of China. There are several small glaciers on the mountain, including Belukha Glacier. Of the two peaks, the eastern peak (4,506 m, 14,784 ft.) is higher than the western peak (4,440 m, 14,567 ft.).

History
Belukha was first climbed in 1914 by the Tronov brothers. Most ascents of the eastern peak follow the same southern route as that taken in the first ascent. Though the Altai is lower in elevation than other Asian mountain groups, it is very remote, and much time and planning are required for its approach.

In the summer of 2001, a team of scientists traveled to the remote Belukha Glacier to assess the feasibility of extracting ice cores at the site. Research was carried out from 2001 to 2003: both shallow cores and cores to bedrock were extracted and analyzed (Olivier and others, 2003; Fujita and others, 2004). Based on tritium dating techniques, the deeper cores may contain as much as 3,000–5,000 years of climatic and environmental records. A Swiss-Russian team also studied the glacier.

See also
 List of highest points of Russian federal subjects
 List of Altai mountains
 List of Ultras of Central Asia
 List of glaciers of Russia

References

Mountains of the Altai Republic
Mountains of Kazakhstan
Glaciers of Russia
Altai Mountains
Kazakhstan–Russia border
International mountains of Asia
Four-thousanders of the Altai
Highest points of Russian federal subjects
South Siberian Mountains